Skhour Rhamna is a small town and rural commune formerly in El Kelâat Es-Sraghna Province of the former Marrakesh-Tensift-El Haouz region of Morocco, now in Rehamna Province in Marrakesh-Safi region of Morocco. At the time of the 2004 census, the commune had a total population of 14346 people living in 2438 households.

References

Populated places in El Kelâat Es-Sraghna Province
Rural communes of Marrakesh-Safi